Charles Henry Bennett (born 1943) is a physicist, information theorist and IBM Fellow at IBM Research. Bennett's recent work at IBM has concentrated on a re-examination of the physical basis of information, applying quantum physics to the problems surrounding information exchange. He has played a major role in elucidating the interconnections between physics and information, particularly in the realm of quantum computation, but also in cellular automata and reversible computing. He discovered, with Gilles Brassard, the concept of quantum cryptography and is one of the founding fathers of modern quantum information theory (see Bennett's four laws of quantum information).

Early career
Born in 1943 in New York City, Bennett earned a B.S. in Chemistry from Brandeis University in 1964 and received his PhD from Harvard in 1970 for molecular-dynamics studies (computer simulation of molecular motion) under David Turnbull and Berni Alder. At Harvard, he also worked for James Watson one year as a teaching assistant about the genetic code. For the next two years he continued this research under Aneesur Rahman at Argonne National Laboratory (operated by the University of Chicago).

After joining IBM Research in 1972, he built on the work of IBM's Rolf Landauer to show that general-purpose computation can be performed by a logically and thermodynamically reversible apparatus; and in 1982 he proposed a re-interpretation of Maxwell's demon, attributing its inability to break the second law to the thermodynamic cost of destroying, rather than acquiring, information. He also published an important paper on the estimation of free-energy differences between two systems, the Bennett acceptance ratio method.

Quantum cryptography
In collaboration with Gilles Brassard of the Université de Montréal, Bennett developed a system of quantum cryptography, building on an idea of Stephen Wiesner.  Known as BB84, the system takes advantage of the uncertainty principle to allow secure communication between parties who share no secret information initially. With the help of John Smolin, he built the world's first working demonstration of quantum cryptography in 1989.

His other research interests include algorithmic information theory, in which the concepts of information and randomness are developed in terms of the input/output relation of universal computers, and the analogous use of universal computers to define the intrinsic complexity or "logical depth" of a physical state as the time required by a universal computer to simulate the evolution of the state from a random initial state.

Teleportation
In 1993 Bennett and Brassard, in collaboration with others, discovered "quantum teleportation", an effect in which the complete information in an unknown quantum state is decomposed into purely classical information and purely non-classical Einstein–Podolsky–Rosen (EPR paradox) correlations, sent through two separate channels, and later reassembled in a new location to produce an exact replica of the original quantum state that was destroyed in the sending process.

Later work
In 1995–1997, working with Smolin, Wootters, DiVincenzo, and other collaborators, he introduced several techniques for faithful transmission of classical and quantum information through noisy channels, part of the larger field of quantum information and computation theory. Together with others he also introduced the concept of entanglement distillation.

Bennett is a Fellow of the American Physical Society and a member of the National Academy of Sciences. He was awarded the 2008 Harvey Prize by the Technion and the 2006 Rank Prize in opto-electronics. In 2017 he received the Dirac Medal of the ICTP and in 2018 the Wolf Prize in Physics. In June 2019, he received the Shannon Award and for 2019 the BBVA Foundation Frontiers of Knowledge Award in Basic Sciences.

Bennett also co-runs a blog, The Quantum Pontiff, with Steve Flammia and Aram Harrow and hosted by Dave Bacon.

Private life
Bennett identifies himself as an atheist. Recalling a fond memory of the physicist Asher Peres, he writes:

References

External links
 Academic biography at Infoamerica.org
 Charles Bennett's page at IBM site
 The Quantum Pontiff blog

Theoretical physicists
1943 births
Living people
Fellows of the American Physical Society
Members of the United States National Academy of Sciences
IBM Fellows
IBM Research computer scientists
Brandeis University alumni
Harvard University alumni
American atheists
Scientists from New York City
20th-century American engineers
21st-century American engineers
20th-century American physicists
21st-century American scientists
Science bloggers
Quantum information scientists
Wolf Prize in Physics laureates